The men's long jump event  at the 1999 IAAF World Indoor Championships was held on March 7.

Results

References
Results

Long
Long jump at the World Athletics Indoor Championships